Ice Guardians is a 2016 feature documentary film directed and written by Brett Harvey about ice hockey enforcers.

The film includes interviews with former National Hockey League players including Hall of Famers Chris Chelios, Jarome Iginla, Bobby Hull and Brett Hull. Other players interviewed include Dave Brown, Kelly Chase, Wendel Clark, Glen Cochrane, Riley Cote, Todd Fedoruk, Nick Fotiu, Mitch Fritz, Luke Gazdic, Clark Gillies, Brett Gallant, Eric Godard, Joey Kocur, Zenon Konopka, Steve MacIntyre, Brian McGrattan, Gino Odjick, Colton Orr, Scott Parker, George Parros, Rob Ray, Dave Schultz, Dave Semenko, Zack Stortini, Rick Tocchet and Kevin Westgarth.

Reception
Ice Guardians was included in Sports Illustrated 's "Best Of Film" in 2016. and Newsweek's "Favorite Documentaries Of 2016".  The film was nominated for four "Rosie Awards" in 2017 including "Best Documentary Over 30 minutes" and nominated for two "Leo Awards" including "Best Feature Documentary" and "Best Director". The movie has received mostly positive reviews.

References

External links
 
 

2016 films
2010s biographical films
2016 documentary films
2010s historical films
American biographical films
American sports documentary films
American historical films
American independent films
Documentary films about ice hockey
Ice hockey in the United States
American ice hockey films
2010s English-language films
2010s American films